Boré is a village and seat of the rural commune of Dangol Boré in the Cercle of Douentza in the Mopti Region of southern-central Mali. The village is on the main highway, the RN15, that links Mopti and Douentza.

Manding is primarily spoken in Boré.

References

Populated places in Mopti Region